Colus pulcius is a species of sea snail, a marine gastropod mollusk in the family Colidae, the true whelks and the like.

Description
(Original description as Colus (Aulacofusus) capponius ) The shell is of moderate size and its height measures 40 mm. The spire is longer than the aperture. The shell is white, with a thin polished, oUvaceous periostracum. The shell contains more than five whorls (the protoconch defective). The whorls are moderately rounded. The suture is distinct and deep. The axial sculpture consists of fine silky incremental striae, sometimes with a tendency to cause wrinkles near the suture. The spiral sculpture consists of (on the penultimate whorl about 17) regular narrow rather deep grooves with much wider flattish interspaces, uniformly covering the whole surface of the shell. The aperture is about twice as long as wide. The  outer lip is retroactively arcuate behind and protractively anteriorly, not reflected. The inner lip shows a thin glaze. The columella is white. The siphonal canal is short, wide and hardly reflected.

Distribution
This marine species occurs in the Bering Strait.

References

 Aurivillius, C. W. S. (1885). Översigt öfver de af Vega-Expeditionen insamlade arktiska Hafsmollusker. II. Placophora och Gastropoda. In: A. E. Nordenskjöld. Vega-Expeditionens Vetenskapliga Iakttagelser, Bearbetade af Deltagare i Resan och andra forskare. 4: 310–383, pls 12, 13
 Kosyan A.R. & Kantor Yu.I. (2013). Revision of the genus Aulacofusus Dall, 1918 (Gastropoda: Buccinidae). Ruthenica: The Russian Malacological Journal. 23(1): 1-33.

External links
 Aurivillius, C. W. S. (1885). Översigt öfver de af Vega-Expeditionen insamlade arktiska Hafsmollusker. II. Placophora och Gastropoda. In: A. E. Nordenskjöld. Vega-Expeditionens Vetenskapliga Iakttagelser, Bearbetade af Deltagare i Resan och andra forskare. 4: 310–383, pls 12, 13

Colidae
Gastropods described in 1919